Harm Done is a novel by British crime-writer Ruth Rendell, published in 1999. The novel is part of her popular Inspector Wexford detective series, and examines themes such as paedophilia and domestic violence.

1999 British novels
Novels by Ruth Rendell
Hutchinson (publisher) books
Inspector Wexford series
Pedophilia in literature